Namig Mammadkarimov (born 21 July 1980), is an Azerbaijani futsal player who plays for Araz Naxçivan and the Azerbaijan national futsal team.

References

External links
UEFA profile

1980 births
Living people
Azerbaijani men's futsal players
Araz Naxçivan players